Preen may refer to:

Birds 
Preening, personal grooming of a bird's feathers especially by using its beak
Preen gland, also called the uropygial gland, an oil gland found in many bird species
Preen oil, an oil made by the uropygial gland found in many bird species

Products
Preen, a trade name for trifluralin

Surname 
Garyn Preen (born 1991), Welsh footballer
Alan Preen (born 1935), former sportsman who played Australian rules football

Social arts & Attire 
Accessories
Foreplay
Fragrance
Hairstyle
Waxing